The Peleg Arnold Tavern off Great Road in Union Village in North Smithfield, Rhode Island was built around 1690 and is one of the oldest homes in North Smithfield. The oldest part of house was built in the late 17th century by Richard Arnold, one of the earliest settlers in the area. His descendant, Peleg Arnold, greatly expanded the building a century later.  Peleg Arnold was a justice of the Rhode Island Supreme Court and representative to the Continental Congress. Arnold's popular tavern served as center of American military operations in the town during the American Revolution. The house was added to the National Register of Historic Places in 1974.

Images

See also 
List of the oldest buildings in Rhode Island
National Register of Historic Places listings in Providence County, Rhode Island

Notes

Sources

Walter Nebiker, The History of North Smithfield (Somersworth, NH: New England History Press, 1976).
Edward Field, State of Rhode Island and Providence Plantations at the End of the Nineteenth Century, (Mason Pub. Co., RI: 1902), 646–649.

External links
NRHP Nomination Form

Commercial buildings on the National Register of Historic Places in Rhode Island
Houses on the National Register of Historic Places in Rhode Island
Taverns in Rhode Island
Taverns in the American Revolution
Houses completed in 1690
North Smithfield, Rhode Island
Houses in Providence County, Rhode Island
Drinking establishments on the National Register of Historic Places in Rhode Island
National Register of Historic Places in Providence County, Rhode Island
Historic district contributing properties in Rhode Island
1690 establishments in Rhode Island